Willamette National Cemetery is a United States National Cemetery located about  southeast of the city of Portland, Oregon. Administered by the United States Department of Veterans Affairs, it encompasses  straddling the county line between Multnomah and Clackamas Counties. As of 2021, there had been 188,000 interments. It is one of three national cemeteries in Oregon (the other two being Roseburg and Eagle Point).

History 
Plans to create a military cemetery in the Portland area started as early as 1941, and Franklin D. Roosevelt signed a bill to establish a national cemetery, but the necessary money to acquire the land was never allocated. Finally, in 1949 the state of Oregon donated  of land for the establishment of a National Cemetery. Construction was completed in 1950, and Willamette National Cemetery was officially opened on December 14 that year. The first interment did not take place until 1951. In 1952, another  of land were donated to the cemetery.

Willamette National Cemetery is a Blue Star Memorial Highway site.

Notable monuments 
 A Korean War Memorial, dedicated to the 283 people from Oregon who fought and died in that war.

Notable interments 

 Medal of Honor recipients
 Lieutenant Colonel Stanley T. Adams (1922–1999), for action in the Korean War
 First Lieutenant Arnold L. Bjorklund (1918–1979), for action in World War II
 Specialist Larry G. Dahl (1949–1971), for action in the Vietnam War
 Sergeant First Class Loren R. Kaufman (1923–1951), for action in the Korean War
 Others
 Alexander G. Barry (1892–1952), United States Senator
 Carson Bigbee (1895–1964), Major League Baseball player
 Milt Davis (1929–2008), professional football player
 George Freese (1926–2014), Major League Baseball player
 Mark Hatfield (1922–2011), U.S. Senator and Governor of Oregon
 Scott Leavitt (1879–1966), U.S. Representative from Montana
 Donald Malarkey (1921–2017), World War II veteran
 Thomas E. Martin (1893–1971), U.S. Representative and Senator from Iowa
 Kenneth L. Reusser (1920–2009), United States Marine Corps aviator
 Homer Norman Wallin (1893–1984), United States Navy admiral

References

External links

 National Cemetery Administration
 Willamette National Cemetery
 
 
 

1949 establishments in Oregon
Cemeteries on the National Register of Historic Places in Oregon
Historic American Landscapes Survey in Oregon
Lents, Portland, Oregon
Protected areas of Clackamas County, Oregon
Protected areas of Multnomah County, Oregon
National Register of Historic Places in Clackamas County, Oregon
National Register of Historic Places in Portland, Oregon
United States national cemeteries